The National Family Health Survey (NFHS) is an India-wide survey conducted by Ministry of Health and Family Welfare, Government of India, with the International Institute for Population Sciences serving as the nodal agency.

History 
In 1992-93, the first round of the National Family Health Survey was conducted in three phases. The main objective of the survey was to collect reliable and up-to-date information on fertility, family planning, mortality, and maternal and child health. Subsequently, three other rounds conducted between 1998 to 2016. 

The latest being NFHS 5 that started in 2019, however, was stalled amid the COVID-19 associated lockdown. Eventually, the NFHS-5 findings were released in December 2020. Based on these findings, the ministry has set up a technical expert group to improve indicators pertaining to Malnutrition, Stunting, Anaemia, and C-Section.

List of surveys

 National Family Health Survey-1 (1992-93)
 National Family Health Survey-2 (1998-99)
 National Family Health Survey-3 (2005-2006)
 National Family Health Survey-4 (2015-2016)
 National Family Health Survey-5 (2019-2021) (latest)

References 

Cohort studies
Indian Council of Medical Research
Medical Council of India